Jonny Polonsky (born July 10, 1973) is an American songwriter, rock guitarist, singer, multi-instrumentalist and record producer.

Career 

Born in Chicago, Illinois and raised in suburban Wilmette, Illinois, Polonsky began writing, recording and self-releasing homemade cassettes as a teenager, under the name The Amazing Jonny Polonsky. Titles included Aw, Blow it Out Yer Ass!, Premium White American, and I Like Porn. Polonsky handed these tapes out to friends, and to musicians he admired. Using the 411 public phone records, Polonsky was able to reach and befriend musical heroes of his such as guitarists Marc Ribot (Tom Waits, Elvis Costello), Zander Schloss (Joe Strummer, Circle Jerks), Reeves Gabrels (David Bowie, Tin Machine), and Pixies singer Frank Black/Black Francis.

Marc Ribot introduced legendary New York composer John Zorn to these early tapes, and Zorn invited Polonsky to play his New Jewish Music festival in 1992 at CBGB's Gallery. Polonsky's band featured Marc Ribot on guitar, Sebastian Steinberg (Soul Coughing) on bass, and Sim Cain (Rollins Band) on drums. Of that performance, singer Jeff Buckley (who was in attendance) was later quoted as saying, "He came to CBGB's Gallery and ripped it up...He killed 'em...The charm of it is that he's brought it into his own thing. It's a nice miniature. He does it with soul; you can tell the difference between someone who just slips into The Beatles or something and someone like him."

A year later Reeves Gabrels introduced Polonsky to Frank Black, who became an immediate fan. In 1994, original Pixies manager Ken Goes began representing Polonsky, and Frank Black produced a demo for him. On the strength of this demo recording, iconic record producer Rick Rubin signed Polonsky as a solo artist to his label American Recordings.

The Frank Black-produced demos were eventually scrapped, and Polonsky decided to rerecord the songs in his childhood home in Wilmette, using digital home recording equipment. He produced, recorded and performed everything himself on his debut record for American. Hi My Name is Jonny was mixed by Brendan O'Brien (Neil Young, Pearl Jam, Bruce Springsteen, Rage Against the Machine) and was released by American Recordings on January 16, 1996. It received an overwhelmingly positive critical reception from international news outlets, from The New York Times to MTV.

Immediately after the record's release, Polonsky and his live band toured as the main support act for Frank Black for twelve weeks in North America. They also performed on the Second Stage for the 1996 Lollapalooza summer tour.

Polonsky then disappeared from recording and touring as a solo artist. He reemerged as a touring musician in the late 1990s and into the new millennium with Local H and Pete Yorn, among others.

In 2004 Polonsky released The Power of Sound, and he and his band supported Audioslave on their five-week North American club tour in the spring of 2005.

In 2006, Polonsky formed the short-lived band Big Nose with Brad Wilk and Tim Commerford of Rage Against the Machine and Audioslave. Big Nose collaborated on two songs with Tool and A Perfect Circle frontman Maynard James Keenan. Keenan ended up using the two songs, "Sour Grapes" and "Momma Sed", for his music/art project Puscifer. Polonsky wrote, recorded and toured with Puscifer from 2007 to 2010.

Since that time, he has also recorded and/or performed with Johnny Cash., Neil Diamond, and Dixie Chicks

In 2012, Polonsky released his third full length, Intergalactic Messenger of Divine Light and Love as an internet only digital release. It was recorded in Rick Rubin's recording studio, Akademie Mathematique of Philosophical Sound Research, and mixed by Tom Petty/Slayer mix engineer Jim Scott.

In 2015, The Other Side of Midnight  was released. It was performed, produced and recorded by Polonsky, and mixed by Dean Hurley at David Lynch's Asymmetrical Studios.

Polonsky's fifth full length record, Fresh Flesh was released in January 2018. It was recorded with his live band in two days at Rick Rubin's studio, Shangri La Studios, in Malibu CA. It features guest performances by vocalist Mark Lanegan (Screaming Trees and Queens of the Stone Age), and drummer Kevin Haskins of Bauhaus (band), Love and Rockets (band), and Tones on Tail.

Kingdom of Sleep,  Polonsky's sixth full length studio album was released on March 6, 2020, to an overwhelming critical reception. Cedric Bixler-Zavala, singer of The Mars Volta and At the Drive-In contributed vocals to the record.

Polonsky's second full length release of 2020, and seventh overall studio album, Power and Greed and Money and Sex and Death was written and recorded during the COVID-19 pandemic lockdown in the spring and summer of 2020. It features guest appearances by Jane Wiedlin of The Go-Gos on vocals, and Hong Wang of the Kung Fu Panda soundtracks on erhu.

Discography

Solo 

Power and Greed and Money and Sex and Death (2020) Ghostworks Recordings
Kingdom of Sleep (2020) Ghostworks Recordings
UNRELEASHED: Demos and Rarities 1996–2018 (2018) Jett Plastic Recordings
Fresh Flesh (2018) Sound Science Industries
The Other Side of Midnight (2015) Sound Science Industries
Vision (EP) (2014) self-released
Intergalactic Messenger of Divine Light and Love (2012) self-released
The Power of Sound (2004) Loveless Records
Touched by Genius: The Ultimate TAJP Collection (2003) self-released
There Is Something Wrong With You (EP) (2001) eggBERT Records
Hi My Name is Jonny (1996) American Recordings

Appearances as instrumentalist 

Puscifer – Conditions of My Parole (2011) Puscifer Entertainment
Tom Morello – World Wide Rebel Songs (2011) New West Records
Johnny Cash – American VI: Ain't No Grave (2010) American Recordings
Pete Yorn – Back and Fourth (2009) Columbia Records
Neil Diamond – Home Before Dark (2008) American Recordings
Mason Jennings – In the Ever (2008) Brushfire Records
Puscifer – V is for Viagra: The Remixes (2008) Puscifer Entertainment
Dan Wilson – Free Life (2007) American Recordings
Minnie Driver – Seastories (2008) Zoë Records
Puscifer – V is for Vagina (2007) Puscifer Entertainment
Johnny Cash – American V: A Hundred Highways (2006) American Recordings
Dixie Chicks – Taking the Long Way (2006) Columbia Records
Neil Diamond – 12 Songs (2005) Columbia Records
Various Artists – Axis of Justice Concert Series, Vol. 1 (2004) Columbia Records
Minnie Driver – Everything I've Got in My Pocket (2004) Zoë Records
Donovan – Sutras (1996) American Recordings

Filmography 
Hi My Name Is Jonny Polonsky (2020) – Documentary (Woestijnvis)

Sleeping Dogs Lie (2005 film)

References

External links 
Official Jonny Polonsky site
Official Facebook page
Official Bandcamp page

American rock musicians
Musicians from Chicago
Living people
1973 births